Reding or Redyng may refer to:

People
Augustine Reding (1625-1692), Swiss Benedictine, Prince-Abbot of Einsiedeln, and theological writer
Jaclyn Reding (b. 1966), American novelist
John Randall Reding (1805-1892), U.S. Representative
Jörg Alois Reding (b. 1951), Swiss Ambassador
Leo J. Reding (1924-2015), American politician
Nick Reding (actor) (born 1962), British actor
Nick Reding (journalist), American journalist
Serge Reding (1941-1975), Belgian weightlifter
Viviane Reding (b. 1951), Luxembourg politician
Alois von Reding (1765-1818), Swiss nobility
Theodor von Reding (1755-1809), Swiss general of the Napoleonic Wars
Henry Redyng, Member of Parliament for Wallingford (UK Parliament constituency) in 1362
Blessed Thomas Redyng (died 1537), one of the Carthusian Martyrs

Places
Réding, a commune in France

See also
3rd Swiss Regiment Reding, an 18th-century Swiss unit in the Spanish Army
Redings Mill, Missouri
Redington (disambiguation)
Reddington (disambiguation)
Redding (disambiguation)
Reddin
Redden (disambiguation)
Reading (disambiguation)